Dobruša is a small settlement in the Municipality of Vodice in the Upper Carniola region of Slovenia.

References

External links 
Dobruša on Geopedia

Populated places in the Municipality of Vodice